Domus Vista is located in Copenhagen at Roskildevej in Frederiksberg and is, at 102 metres, the tallest residential structure in Denmark and the second tallest residential building in Scandinavia. The tallest is Turning Torso in Malmö, which was completed in 2005.

History 
The building was designed by architect Ole Hagen and was completed in 1969. It was built by builder Harald Simonsen, who also took part in the construction of Hostrups Have in Frederiksberg. 

Domus Vista has 30 floors and 470 apartments. The lower floors were originally a hotel with restaurant, banquet facilities and living rooms. The hotel was closed in the early 1970s. The ground floor now houses a shopping centre and library.

References 

Apartment buildings in Copenhagen
Skyscrapers in Denmark
Residential skyscrapers